Somerset County Cricket Club are an English cricket club based in Taunton, Somerset.  The club was founded in 1875 after a match between "Gentlemen of Somerset" and "Gentlemen of Devon" in Sidmouth, Devon. Somerset played their first undisputed first-class cricket match in 1882 against Lancashire.  After missing the first season of the official County Championship, Somerset were admitted for the second in 1891, and have participated in the competition ever since. The club have played both List A cricket and Twenty20 cricket since their introductions into the English game in 1963 and 2003 respectively.

Considered in terms of trophies won, Brian Rose was Somerset's most successful captain, with the county winning five one-day trophies in as many seasons under his captaincy. The county's longest serving captain was Sammy Woods, who was club captain for thirteen seasons from 1894 to 1906.  Woods also captained the side on the most occasions, leading his team in 230 first-class fixtures.  John Daniell, Brian Close, Marcus Trescothick and Rose are the only other captains to have led Somerset over 200 times, and Rose's total of 112 List A matches as captain is the most by a Somerset player. Trescothick has captained Somerset in Twenty20 cricket on the most occasions, doing so 49 times.

Captaincy history
Since attaining first-class status, Somerset have named 37 official captains.  Stephen Newton was the club's first official captain, holding the position during the county's first three seasons of first-class cricket, from 1882 to 1884.  Due to his commitments as a schoolmaster in London, he did not play in the opening three matches of 1882, so other players were required to deputise for him in these fixtures. Edward Sainsbury, who took over from Newton for the 1885 season, captained the side in the joint fewest matches along with Mandy Mitchell-Innes: both players captained Somerset in six first-class matches.  During the 1885 season, Somerset failed to arrange sufficient fixtures with the other first-class teams to be retain its first-class status, and matches played between 1886 and 1890 were considered 'second-class'.  During this time, the captaincy was transferred to Herbie Hewett who, after captaining his side unbeaten against county opposition in 1890, retained the captaincy upon Somerset's return to first-class cricket the following summer. Hewett continued as captain for three further seasons, but retired from the captaincy and the club at the end of the 1893 season following an incident in which he felt his authority had been undermined by the club. His successor as captain was Sammy Woods, who remained in the position for twelve years, the longest by any Somerset captain.  Woods, born on the outskirts of Sydney in Australia had played three Test matches for Australia in the late 1880s, and was Somerset's first captain of overseas origin, although he lived the rest of his life in Somerset and also played three Tests for England. He led Somerset in 230 first-class matches, and holds the record for both the most first-class and the most overall matches captained by any Somerset player.

Between 1894 and 1946, the club captaincy remained reasonably stable, six official captains spanned the 52-year period.  In addition to Woods, John Daniell, Jack White and Reggie Ingle all captained the side on more than 150 occasions, and Lionel Palairet led the team for one season and Massey Poyntz for two.  Bunty Longrigg was captain of the side either side of the Second World War, totalling 73 matches.  In contrast, the following nine years saw the club utilise eight different official captains, and a number more unofficial ones.  Jack Meyer, who went on to found Millfield, stood down at the end of 1947, his first season as captain.  In 1948, the club committee claimed that it was unable to find anyone of suitable pedigree to lead the side for the whole summer, and was forced to name three captains for the season.  Mandy Mitchell-Innes led the side throughout the pre-season and for the first five matches of the County Championship during leave from the Sudan Political Service. The captaincy then passed onto Jake Seamer, also on leave from the Sudan Political Service, for seven matches, before the committee settled on George Woodhouse, who remained in the position for the following 1949 season. The next three captains – Stuart Rogers, Ben Brocklehurst and Gerry Tordoff – all captained the side for three seasons or less, and in the words of cricket writer and Somerset County Cricket Club historian David Foot, "captaincy had, ever since the war... been a matter of recurrent concern." This concern, and the fact that there was a lack of amateurs with the necessary time and money to dedicate to the role, meant that in 1956 the club appointed Maurice Tremlett to the role, the county's first professional captain.

The Australian, Colin McCool had been favoured by many, but claimed that he "wouldn't have taken it had there been a life pension to go with it."  He observed that the rapid turnover of captains in the previous few years meant that the club had "no feeling of being a cricket team.. players just didn't know what was going on."  The decision to pick a professional captain had not been the committee's first choice, and they had chosen Tremlett only after considering a number of amateur options. Even once he had the position, his four years as captain did not run smoothly; club officials felt he was too lax, and there were numerous attempts to remove him from the captaincy. During his tenure, Somerset rose rapidly in the County Championship standings.  In 1955, the season before he took over, they had finished in 17th place, bottom of the table.  In 1958, his penultimate year as captain, they finished in third, their joint highest position since formation. Despite this success, the Somerset committee was critical of Tremlett's captaincy.  Tremlett, in face of constant criticism, lost interest in the captaincy and after a poor 1959 season, was removed from the position.

Key
 Years denotes the years in which the player was named as official club captain for Somerset.
 First denotes the date of the first match in which the player captained Somerset.
 Last denotes the date of the last match in which the player captained Somerset.
 FC denotes the number of first-class matches in which the player captained Somerset.
 LA denotes the number of List A matches in which the player captained Somerset.
 T20 denotes the number of Twenty20 matches in which the player captained Somerset.
 Total denotes the total number of first-class, List A and Twenty20 matches in which the player captained Somerset.

Official captains

Unofficial captains
This is a list of players who have captained Somerset without having been appointed official club captain.

References
General

Specific

Bibliography

 
Somerset
Captains